Expositiuncula in Ioannem Evangelistam ("Little Commentary on John the Evanglist") is a work by the ninth-century Benedictine monk Christian of Stavelot. As its name implies, it is a commentary on the Gospel of John. It is, however, not nearly as comprehensive as his earlier Expositio in Matthaeum Evangelistam.

References
Schaff, Philip. History of the Christian Church. Volume IV: Mediaeval Christianity. A.D. 590–1073. Grand Rapids, MI, 1882. Page 172. Online as Christian Druthmar at CCEL

9th-century Christian texts